Lake Umayo (Spanish: Laguna Umayo) is a lake in Atuncolla District of the Puno Region of Peru. The Sillustani burial ground is near the shores of the lake.

Gallery

See also
List of lakes in Peru
Hatunqucha

References

Bibliography
INEI, Compendio Estadistica 2007, page 26

Lakes of Peru
Lakes of Puno Region